Bhagwati Devi Sharma was an Indian social reformer who was the co-founder of AWGP and patron founder of Akhand Jyoti.

Personal life 
Bhagvati Devi married Shriram Sharma in 1946. She assisted him in managing All World Gayatri Pariwar (AWGP) and after his death, she succeeded him as head of AWGP. Her followers call her Mataji.

Honors 

 A school in Jhansi is named after her.
 Her death anniversary was celebrated in Giridih.
 In her death anniversary, 105 lamps were lighted in Shantikunj.
 Her death anniversary is celebrated as Prakaatya Diwas in Jharkhand.

References 

People from Haridwar district